Not to be mistaken for Andrzej Kijowski, his father.
Andrzej Tadeusz Kijowski (born 15 July 1954, Kraków) is a Polish aesthetician, theatre critic, literary critic, poet and publicist. 
Son of the writer Andrzej Kijowski. From 1976 to 1989 participated in the democratic opposition. Cooperated with KOR (Workers' Defence Committee) and NOWa (Independent Printing House). From 1990 to 1994 helped to create the new self-government.

He worked at Nowa Telewizja and TV Polonia 1 in Warsaw from 1992 to 1995, where he made over 250 television programmes. Author of the Garden Theatre Competition and the Frascati Gardens arts festival.

Member of the Polish Writers’ Association, the Polish Journalists’ Association, and the Freedom of Word Association.

From 2017 Spokesman on Freedom of the Speech in the Polish "National Broadcasting Council".

Literary Work 
Chwyt Teatralny (Theatrical trick); (Wydawnictwo Literackie 1982)
Teoria Teatru (The Theory of Theatre); (Ossolineum 1985)
Separacja.SMS-y poetyckie (Separation, SMS poetics); (published by author 2005)
Opis obyczajów w 15-leciu międzysojuszniczym 1989–2004 (Description of the mores between the two alliances 1989–2004) (AnTraKt Publisher) 2010, vol. I-IV.
Odsłanianie Dramatu (Revealing the drama) (vol. I) 
A Teraz Konkretnie (And now, more precisely) (vol. II) 
Teatr to miejsce spotkania (The theater is a meeting place) vol. III-IV.
Paradoks o Ogródkach (Garden's Paradox) (vol. III) 
Thea to znaczy widzenie (Thea that is to say the View) (vol. IV) 
 Organizacja kultury w społeczeństwie obywatelskim na tle gospodarki rynkowej. Czasy kultury 1789–1989 (Organization of culture in civil society in the context of the market economy. Age of culture 1789–1989)., Warszawa 2015).Title subsidized by the Polish Ministry of Science and Higher Education.

See also 
 List of aestheticians
 List of Polish language poets

References

Sources 

 Who is Who w Polsce ;Verlag für Personenenzyklopädien AG) – Hübners Who is Who
 Paradoks o ogródkach (Garden's Paradox) – by ROMAN PAWŁOWSKI – Gazeta Wyborcza 27–08.2001
 Polish bibliography 1988 – 2001

1954 births
Living people
Writers from Warsaw
Polish essayists
Male essayists
Polish poets
Polish journalists
Polish television journalists
Polish television personalities
University of Warsaw alumni
Polish democracy activists
Members of the Workers' Defence Committee
Polish male poets
Recipients of decoration of Honor for activist of anti-communist opposition or repressed person for political reasons